The men's 50 metres butterfly at the 2018 World Para Swimming European Championships was held at the National Aquatic Centre in Dublin from 13 to 19 August.  Two classification finals were held in all over this event.

Medalists

See also
List of IPC world records in swimming

References

50 metres butterfly